David Cárcamo (born 2 August 1970) is a Honduran footballer. He played in twelve matches for the Honduras national football team from 1999 to 2002. He was also part of Honduras's squad for the 2001 Copa América tournament.

References

External links
 

1970 births
Living people
Honduran footballers
Honduras international footballers
Place of birth missing (living people)
Association football defenders